René Brossy (5 April 1906 – 3 December 1991) was a French cyclist. He competed in the three events at the 1928 Summer Olympics.

References

External links
 

1906 births
1991 deaths
French male cyclists
Olympic cyclists of France
Cyclists at the 1928 Summer Olympics
Cyclists from Paris